Benton High School is a public high school located in Benton, Saline County, Arkansas. Benton High School is a member of the Benton School District.

History
In 1885, a public referendum established the Benton School District within the county-wide system. In Saline County in 1889, there were about 4,700 students, 62 teachers, and 50 public schools.  In addition, there were several private schools in the county. After 1900, smaller neighboring school districts were consolidated with the Benton District, making it possible to have a larger and better teaching force, improved equipment, and longer terms. However, it was not until the 1920s that children were required to attend school. Starting in 1928, rural children that did not have access to high school courses were allowed to transfer to Benton High and were not charged tuition. The Great Depression of the 1930s created a financial crisis in education, causing Benton school teachers to work for several years at almost half pay.  In 1930, Hill’s Business College of Little Rock was established at Benton High School, where citizens of Saline County could take night classes. School enrollment grew during and after World War II.

Academic programs 
Benton High School has been consistently recognized for its academic excellence including selection in the U.S. News & World Report America's Best High Schools.  In addition, honors received include:

 No. 1 in Geometry Test Scores for Two Consecutive Years
 2009 AAA Academic Cheer Champions - No. 1 in Arkansas
 2015, 2014, 2012, 2009, 2006, 2004, 2002, 2001, 1999, 1998, 1997, 1995 and 1993 State Champions Quiz Bowl

Extracurricular activities 
The Benton High School mascot and athletic emblem is the panther, with maroon and gray serving as the school colors.

Athletics 
For the 2012–14 school years, the Benton Panthers competed in the 6A Classification within the 7A/6A South Conference as administered by the Arkansas Activities Association. The Panthers participated in football, volleyball, baseball, basketball (boys/girls), bowling (boys/girls), competitive cheer, cross country, football, golf (boys/girls), soccer (boys/girls), softball, swimming & diving (boys/girls), tennis (boys/girls), track & field (boys/girls), and wrestling.

Salt Bowl 
Benton and Bryant High schools meet for the first game of the season in Little Rock's War Memorial Stadium. This game is known as the Salt Bowl. The average attendance exceeds 20,000 spectators, with 34,086 in attendance in 2015. The rivalry started when a group of students from Bryant painted a panther statue pink, so in response Benton students dropped a load of pink marshmallows from a helicopter on Bryant High's football field in 1974.

Notable alumni 
 Wes Gardner -MLB Player
 Cliff Lee (1997)—Major League Baseball pitcher; 2008 American League Cy Young Award winner.
 Richard Womack (1993)—Member of the Arkansas House of Representatives from District 18 in Clark, Dallas, Hot Spring, and Garland counties.
 Adam Faucett (2000)—musician

References

External links 

 

1885 establishments in Arkansas
Public high schools in Arkansas
Educational institutions established in 1885
Schools in Saline County, Arkansas
Benton, Arkansas